Kearsarge Pass is a pass in the Sierra Nevada of California. The pass permits foot traffic between Kings Canyon National Park and the John Muir Wilderness.

The Alabama Hills were named after the latter ship, and the mine was named in reaction. The first known crossing of Kearsarge Pass was in 1864.

See also
 Kearsarge Pinnacles

References

Mountain passes of the Sierra Nevada (United States)
Landforms of Fresno County, California
Landforms of Inyo County, California
Kings Canyon National Park